Hazelwood House may refer to:
Hunton Park country house and estate in Abbots Langley, Hertfordshire, England, formerly known as Hazelwood House
 Hazelwood House, Sligo, Palladian style country house 2 miles south-east of Sligo town, Ireland

See also 
 Hazelwood (disambiguation)